Mika Chunuonsee (born 26 March 1989) is a professional footballer who plays as a right-back or a centre-back for Thai League 1 club Lamphun Warriors. Born in Wales, he represents the Thailand national team.

Club career
Born in Bridgend, Wales, Chunuonsee spent two years as a scholar with Cardiff City before joining Bryntirion Athletic and then Neath Athletic. He joined Neath in June 2008 but departed the club in September 2008 to join Afan Lido. In January 2009 he scored his first goal for the club. In July 2009, he moved to Muangthong United.

International career
Chunuonsee represented his country of birth Wales at Under 17 level in the UEFA Under 17 Elite Tournament in Cyprus for matches against Spain, Cyprus and Moldova March 2006. Other players involved in that squad were Senior Welsh Internationals Gareth Bale, Aaron Ramsey and Chris Gunter, whilst Eagles team-mates Kyle Graves, Daniel Lancey and Scott Evans were also involved.

In January 2015, Chunuonsee was called up by Kiatisuk Senamuang to play for Thailand in the 2015 King's Cup. He made the first appearance in the match against Honduras U-20 in King's Cup. However, it was not counted as the official senior cap for Thailand since the competitor was the youth team. A year later, On 3 June 2016, Chunuonsee made his official debut for Thailand national senior team in FIFA International A match after came off the bench at the 75th minute to replace Teerasil Dangda in 2016 King's Cup semi-finals against Syria. The game ended at 2–2 after ninety minutes. Chunuonsee contributed in the penalty shoot-out and helped Thailand to advance to the final. In 2018, he was called up by Thailand national team for the 2018 AFF Suzuki Cup. He was named for the final squad in 2019 AFC Asian Cup.

Personal life
Chunuonsee was born in Bridgend, and moved to Ko Samui with his family when he was 1 year old. He later moved back to Wales when he was 10. His father is Thai from Surat Thani and his mother is Welsh.
 
In November 2019, Chunuonsee married Taya Rogers, a Thai-American actress and super model. The couple now have two children. One daughter, Mila, who was born in February 2021. One son, Jaden, born in December 2022.

Statistics

Honours

Club
Muangthong United
 Thai Premier League (1): 2009

International
Thailand
 King's Cup (1): 2016

References

External links
 
 
Mika Chunuonsee profile at the Bangkok United website

1989 births
Living people
Footballers from Bridgend
Mika Chunuonsee
Mika Chunuonsee
British Asian footballers
Welsh footballers
Mika Chunuonsee
Association football defenders
Afan Lido F.C. players
Mika Chunuonsee
Mika Chunuonsee
Mika Chunuonsee
Mika Chunuonsee
Mika Chunuonsee
Mika Chunuonsee
Mika Chunuonsee
Mika Chunuonsee
Mika Chunuonsee
Welsh expatriate footballers
Welsh expatriate sportspeople in Thailand
Expatriate footballers in Thailand
Wales youth international footballers
Mika Chunuonsee
2019 AFC Asian Cup players
Thai expatriate sportspeople in Wales